The Zookeeper's War (2007) is a novel by Australian author Steven Conte. It won the inaugural Prime Minister's Literary Award for Fiction in 2008.

Plot summary

The novel tells the story of Vera Frey, a young Australian who marries the heir to Berlin Zoo just prior to World War II.  As the zoo's workers are conscripted and replaced by PoWs, Vera and her husband Axel fight to maintain the zoo's standards and to survive as the world about them disintegrates.

Notes
 Dedication: For my grandmother, Marion Marcus, 1901-2003. With love and thanks for other stories.

Reviews

 John Bailey in The Age noted: "Conte's prose style is unhurried and unforced, rarely indulging in acrobatic feats and only occasionally hinting at the journeyman status sometimes evident in first novels."

Awards and nominations

 2008 shortlisted Commonwealth Writer's Prize — South East Asia and South Pacific Region - Best First Novel 
 2008 winner Prime Minister's Literary Award — Fiction

References

2007 Australian novels
Novels set during World War II
Novels set in Berlin
Novels set in zoos
Fourth Estate books